Chamarajanagar or Chamarajanagara is a town in the southern part of Karnataka, India. Named after Chamaraja Wodeyar IX, the erstwhile king of Mysore, previously known as 'Arikottara'. Chamarajanagara is the headquarters of Chamarajanagar district. It is located on the interstate highway linking the neighboring states of Tamil Nadu and Kerala.

History 
Chamarajanagar was earlier known as Sri Arikottara. Chamaraja Wodeyar, the Wodeyar of Mysuru was born here and hence this place was renamed after him. The Vijaya Parsvanath Basadi, a holy jain shrine was constructed by Punisadandanayaka, the commander of the Hoysala king Gangaraja in the year 1117 AD.

Geography 

Demographics
As of the 2011 census, Chamrajanagar had a population of 69875. Males constituted 51% of the population and females 49%. Chamrajanagar has an average literacy rate of 60%, higher than the national average of 59.5%; with male literacy of 65% and female literacy of 54%. 12% of the population is under 6 years of age.

Transport
Chamarajanagar railway station is the southernmost rail point in Karnataka. There is a direct train to Tirupati which starts at three in the afternoon and a direct train to Bengaluru in the morning. The nearest airport is Mysore airport and the nearest international airports are in Coimbatore International Airport and Kempegowda International Airport

Religious Scenario
Maaravva or Maaramma is the most widely worshiped deity in the town, more than ten temples of Maaravva can be found in the town. Chamarajeshwara Temple and Haralu Kote Anjaneya Temple are the biggest and the oldest temples respectively. Apart from these, the town has many temples. As far as other religious beliefs are concerned, the town has more than 15 mosques, 5 churches, 2 Jain Basadis, and 2 Buddha Viharas.

Bandit Veerappan

Since a lot of the southern area of the district is dense forest, it provides good refuge to the notorious bandit Veerappan, responsible for the death of over a hundred policemen. He was shot dead in an encounter with the specially formed Special Task Force (STF) on 18 October 2004 in Dharmapuri district, Tamil Nadu. He had been on the run for over two decades. The presence of illegal quarrying for black stone imposes a great threat to the forests in the region.

Image gallery

See also
Chamarajanagar
Kollegal
Yelandur
Gundlupet
Male Mahadeshwara Hills
Biligiriranga Hills
Bandipur National Park, 
Chinnada Gudi Hundi
Badana Guppe
Mariyala-Gangavadi Halt
Mukkadahalli
Mysore–Chamarajanagar branch line
Kellamballi
Rechamballi
Kagalvadi
Irasavadi
Badanaguppe
Mariyala
Bandalli

References

External links

 http://chamrajnagar.nic.in
 https://web.archive.org/web/20110903082210/http://www.chamarajanagaracity.gov.in/

Cities and towns in Chamarajanagar district